Hate Story 3 is a 2015 Indian Hindi-language erotic thriller film directed by Vishal Pandya. Produced by T-Series, it stars Sharman Joshi, Karan Singh Grover, Zareen Khan and Daisy Shah, with Priyanshu Chatterjee in a pivotal role. Written by Vikram Bhatt, Anupam Saroj and Madhuri Banerji, the film is part of the Hate Story film series. The film was released on 4 December 2015 and was a box office success.

Plot

The movie begins with rich businessman Aditya Dewan (Sharman Joshi) and his wife Siya (Zarine Khan) inaugurating a hospital in memory of his elder brother, Vikram Dewan (Priyanshu Chatterjee). He shares a touching story of Vikram donating half of his liver to his friend Karan who had a liver issue during childhood.

Out of the blue, a businessman named Saurav Singhania (Karan Singh Grover), gifts Aditya an expensive car and invites him and his wife for lunch. At lunch, Saurav makes an absurd deal of having sex with Siya in return for giving Aditya's company a big profit. Aditya angrily rejects the offer. Saurav starts plotting to destroy Aditya's business. He bribes one of Aditya's factory workers to mix pesticides in his cola factory, forcing Aditya to shut down and leading him to put all the blame on his trusted employee Kaya (Daisy Shah).

Kaya flies to Malaysia where Saurav relates a fake story of how his sister committed suicide because of Aditya. Kaya and Saurav have sex and she agrees to help him. Aditya asks Kaya to deliver money to a politician but this is revealed to be a trap and Kaya is accused. To help her Saurav asks her to call Aditya and tell him that she no longer wants to be his pawn. When Kaya is upset at having falsely implicated Aditya, Saurav kills her and puts the blame on Aditya. Seeing all the evidence go against Aditya, Siya decides to have sex with Saurav. It is revealed that Vikram was killed by his brother Aditya so he could become chairman of the company. Siya poisons Saurav and leaves with proof of Aditya's innocence in Kaya's death.

Aditya gets ready to start a new project. Saurav is revealed to be alive. He confronts Aditya and they engage in a physical fight with both of them getting injured. In the end, Saurav kills both Siya and Aditya and collapses afterwards.

It is revealed that, Vikram survived the plane crash but was handicapped. It is also revealed that Saurav is actually Karan (Vikram's best friend) who had decided to avenge the injustice done to his friend. The movie ends with Saurav recovering and the dialogue "Relationships are made from the heart, not by blood."

Cast
 Sharman Joshi as Aditya Dewan, Vikram's younger brother
 Karan Singh Grover as Saurav Singhania / Fake Vikram Dewan / Karan Singhania
 Zareen Khan as Siya Dewan, Aditya's wife and Vikram's lover
 Daisy Shah as Kaya Sharma
 Prithvi Zutshi as Vaswani
 Priyanshu Chatterjee as Vikram Dewan, Aditya's elder brother and Siya’s lover (Cameo)
 Shiny Dixit as Aditya Dewan's secretary
 Puja Gupta as an item girl in song "Neendein Khul Jaati Hain"

Production
With the success of Hate Story 2, producer Bhushan Kumar signed director Vishal Pandya for a three-picture deal with T-Series Studios. Early casting included actor Sharman Joshi, but he was replaced by Gurmeet Choudhary for a brief period of time due to conflicts with Joshi's schedule. 26 February 2015, Joshi reported that he was prepared for scenes where he would be nude, and on 1 March, he reported that he was enjoying shooting his explicit scenes. Actress Daisy Shah was brought aboard the project through Salman Khan's insistence that producer Bhushan Kumar speak with her about joining the project. Filming ended on 16 October 2015.

Casting

Puja Gupta was roped in to do a special song 'Neendein Khul Jaati Hain' in the film.

Filming 

The item song was filmed in October 2015.

Soundtrack

The music for Hate Story 3 is composed by Amaal Mallik, Meet Bros and Baman, while lyrics are written by Kumaar, Manoj Muntashir, Rashmi Virag and Shabbir Ahmed. The music rights for the film have been acquired by T-Series. The first song titled "Tumhe Apna Banane Ka" was released on 21 October 2015, followed by "Tu Isaq Mera" which released on 29 Oct 2015. The full music album was released on 4 November 2015.

The song "Tumhe Apna Banane Ka" is a remake from the 1991 film Sadak.

Critical reception
Bollywood hungama gave the film 3.5 stars. Meena Iyer of The Times of India gave the film 3 stars. Rohit Vats of Hindustan Times gave the film 1.5 stars. Shubhra Gupta of Indian Express gave it 1 star. Koimoi gave it 1 star.Subhash K. Jha of SKJ Bollywood News gave the film 2 stars.
Saibal Chaterjee of NDTV gave the film 1 star.

Box office
According to Daily News and Analysis by ZMCL, the film collected  nett on its opening day.
On its second day the film collected  nett. Oneindia (Filmi Beat) declared the film a Super Hit after it collected  in its opening weekend. The film collected  nett on its second Friday. The movie made  by the end of week 1 at the box office. The film collected  nett in its second weekend to take its total to  nett after ten days. The film collected   in 12 days. The movie finished its run with approx..

Awards and nominations

See also
 Hate Story (film series)

References

External links

 
 

2015 films
Indian erotic thriller films
2010s Hindi-language films
2010s business films
T-Series (company) films
Indian business films
2010s erotic thriller films
Indian films about revenge
Films scored by Sunny and Inder Bawra
Films directed by Vishal Pandya
Films about businesspeople